Anugraha Narayan Road railway station ( also known as Powerganj) is a main railway station in Aurangabad district, Bihar. Its code is AUBR. It serves Aurangabad town. The station consists of four platforms. The station is named after freedom fighter and first Deputy Chief Minister cum Finance Minister of the Indian state of Bihar (1946–1957) Bihar Vibhuti Dr. Anugrah Narayan Singh. Anugraha Narayan is A grade station which falls under Pt Deendayal Upadhyaya division (formerly known as Mughalsarai). Under the scheme of digital India, WiFi facility is available here.

It is mainly connected to Delhi, Mumbai, Kolkata, Jaipur, Lucknow, Ahmedabad, Bhubaneswar, Indore, Pune, Bhopal, Patna, Kanpur, Ranchi, Jamshedpur and Jodhpur.  
     
AN Road has stoppage of 56 trains which includes Superfast, Express and Passenger trains.

In 2019 AN Road was ranked the 10th most improved station throughout the country by scoring 796.88 out of 1000. The station has been provided with several passenger-friendly amenities and modern facilities. The waiting hall of the station has been decorated with wall paintings, and a fast food unit has been provided on platform two. A train display board for train information, as well as a coach induction board for coach location, has been provided at the station. People who want to visit Deo Surya Mandir and Umga Pahad, Pawai Pahad can deboard at this station.

References

External links

Railway stations in Aurangabad district, Bihar
Mughalsarai railway division
Aurangabad, Bihar